Osmundea is  a genus of red algae in the family Rhodomelaceae.

Selected species
Osmundea hybrida
Osmundea pinnatifida

References

Red algae genera
Rhodomelaceae
Taxa named by John Stackhouse